Kumho Cultural Foundation, owned by the Kumho Asiana Group of South Korea is one of the major arts organizations in Korea.
It functions as a concert management company for world-renowned artists and groups, and a recording company and talent agency for young artists of extraordinary talents.

Affiliated artists
Yura Lee
Rachel Lee
Kyung Wha Chung
Hyuk Joo Kwun

Affiliated groups
Berlin Philharmonic
Philadelphia Orchestra
New York Philharmonic

Link
Kumho Cultural Foundation

Foundations based in South Korea